Milestones in the history of communications satellites.

See also
Timeline of first artificial satellites by country
First images of Earth from space

References

Firsts
Lists of firsts in space
Satellite firsts
Technology-related lists
Lists of satellites